The Florida–Florida State football rivalry is an American college football rivalry between the teams of the two oldest public universities of the U.S. state of Florida: the University of Florida (UF) Gators and Florida State University (FSU) Seminoles. Both universities participate in a range of intercollegiate sports, and for the last several years, the Florida Department of Agriculture and Consumer Services has sponsored a "Sunshine Showdown" promotion that tallies the total number of wins for each school in head-to-head sports competition. However, the annual football game between the Gators and Seminoles has consistently been the most intense and notable competition between the in-state rivals.

FSU and UF first met on the gridiron in 1958 and have played every year since except in 2020, when scheduling modifications due to the COVID-19 pandemic interrupted what was the fourth longest continuous series in college football. The contest has usually been played late in the season and was scheduled on the Saturday after Thanksgiving from 1981 until 2022, when it was moved to the Friday after Thanksgiving. The rivals have also clashed twice in New Orleans in the Sugar Bowl, marking the only occasions in which they've met anywhere besides their on-campus stadiums.

Florida dominated the series until Bobby Bowden became FSU's coach in 1976, after which the rivalry became much more competitive. The intensity level rose to its highest point in the 1990s, when the Gators under Steve Spurrier and the Seminoles under Bowden each came into their contest with top ten rankings for every meeting from 1990 until 2001, adding national championship implications to an already heated in-state rivalry. The winner of the game would go on to compete for a national championship in six of those seasons (1993, 1995, 1996, 1998, 1999, 2000). While both programs have been less consistently successful in more recent years, the rivalry carries in-state bragging rights and is still hotly contested. Florida leads the overall series 37–27–2, FSU leads 25–22–1 since Bowden's first year in 1976, and the rivals have split the past twenty meetings with ten wins apiece.

Series history

Roots of a rivalry

Establishment of football programs

Several state-supported colleges in Florida established football programs in the early years of the 20th century, including Florida Agricultural College in Lake City, Florida State College (FSC) in Tallahassee, and the East Florida Seminary in Gainesville. FSC's program was active for three seasons (1902 to 1904), and it claimed unofficial state championships in each of those years while playing a limited schedule against in-state private and public schools.

With passage of the Buckman Act in 1905, the Florida Legislature completely reorganized the state's university system. Florida State College became Florida State College for Women, ending its football program. Four other state-supported schools (including the East Florida Seminary and Florida Agricultural College) were consolidated to establish the new University of Florida (UF), a school for men in Gainesville. Florida State College's last football coach, Jack Forsythe, was hired to lead the new school's football program, which began play in 1906. UF's sports teams took on the nickname "Gators" in 1911, and the school was a founding member of the Southeastern Conference when it was established in 1932.

The Florida Legislature reorganized the state's university system again in 1947 to accommodate the post-World War II surge in college enrollment. Both the University of Florida and Florida State College for Women became coeducational, and the Tallahassee institution changed its name to "Florida State University" (FSU). FSU re-established its football program in 1947, and it soon became a founding member of the non-scholarship Dixie Conference. In 1951, FSU left the Dixie Conference, began offering football scholarships, and scheduled games against major college programs as an independent, at which point FSU officials and supporters began pushing for games against the Gators.

Starting the series
The University of Florida administration, however, was reluctant to treat Florida State University as an equal, less for reasons of intercollegiate sports rivalry than for reasons of limited state funding for higher education and the perception that Florida State's demands for a greater share of those funds might undercut the University of Florida's role as the state's historic flagship university. As the impasse dragged on, a bill was proposed in the Florida Legislature in 1955 which would have mandated that the two schools compete against each other in football and other sports. While the bill was voted down, Florida Governor LeRoy Collins personally requested to University of Florida president J. Wayne Reitz that he take the lead in starting a yearly football series between the two state universities. Reitz agreed, and the schools negotiated a contract that began their football series in 1958, the first available opening on the Gators' non-conference schedule.

One of the stipulations in the first contract was that all games be played in the Gators' home stadium, Florida Field in Gainesville, because the Seminoles' home field at Doak Campbell Stadium had a capacity of under 20,000. The first six games in the series were all played in Gainesville.  Florida State initiated a series of expansions to Doak Campbell Stadium, and beginning in 1964, the game site has alternated on an annual home-and-away basis between Gainesville and Tallahassee.  The Gators hold a 22–12–1 series advantage in games held in Gainesville. The series is tied in games played in Tallahassee, 14–14–1.  The Gators and Seminoles have split two neutral-site games—both Sugar Bowls played in the Mercedes-Benz Superdome in New Orleans (1994 and 1997). Since the game became a home-and-home rivalry, the Gators lead the series 31–25–1.

Early contests

With a strong advantage in resources, facilities, and home field advantage (the first six games of the series were played in Gainesville), the Gators would dominate the rivalry in its formative years, though often in low-scoring contests. Florida won the first three contests before a 3–3 tie in 1961 that Gator coach Ray Graves likened to "a death in the family." The teams finally played in newly expanded Doak Campbell Stadium in 1964, and FSU finally beat Florida, a feat they repeated in Gainesville in 1967.

Overall, however, the Gators were 16–2–1 against the Seminoles from 1958 until 1976. One particularly poor stretch for the Seminoles was from 1969 to 1972 when wide receiver Barry Smith was playing for Florida State. He didn't play in the 1969 contest since freshmen were not eligible then but later recalled his experiences in the rivalry for The Tampa Tribune,

"My sophomore year . . . I ran a reverse . . . and I remember being nailed by Jack Youngblood.  I remember watching the ball being pitched to me and thinking, when the ball was about halfway, that it was kind of race to see whether he was going to get to the ball first or me.  He was foaming at the mouth.  I still have nightmares from the hit he gave me . . . .  My junior year, we were 5–0 and Florida was 0–5.  There is no question that we were the much better team, and they beat us . . . .  My senior year, we're playing Florida at home and we're 4–0.  They had a decent team, but it wasn't like the year before . . . .  Chan Gailey was their quarterback, and he had a big game.  That game was a blowout.  They torched us.  It got so bad, I had to throw a touchdown pass . . . ."

1976–1989: Arrival of Bowden; the rise and fall of Pell
Bobby Bowden arrived at Florida State in 1976 and began to turn around the athletic program. After losing his first game against Florida in 1976, the Seminoles would win the next four in the rivalry, their first wins in the series since 1967. This would begin a decade and a half period in which the rivals would take turns running off winning streaks against the other.

The Gators changed leadership as well, hiring coach Charley Pell from Clemson University to replace Doug Dickey in 1979.  After a dismal 0–10–1 first season, Pell quickly turned around the Florida program, fielding championship-contending teams by the early 1980s.

Under Pell's leadership, Florida took their turn dominating the rivalry from 1981 to 1986, including putting a series-record 53 points on the scoreboard in the 1983 contest. However, an NCAA investigation of Florida's football program revealed multiple violations of rules in the early years of Pell's tenure. Pell was fired and the program put on probation beginning in 1985. For the next 3 seasons, Florida played with a reduced number of scholarship players and Gator football games could not appear on television, setting the program back considerably and allowing Florida State to sign more talented in-state high school recruits.

In 1986, the Gators extended their winning streak against FSU with a 17–13 upset in Tallahassee. However, FSU then ran off four consecutive victories over Florida as they became a fixture in the top-10 rankings and Florida's program floundered under heavy NCAA sanctions.

From the arrival of Bowden in 1976 to the end of the 1980s, the series was tied 7–7. The return of a familiar face to the Gators' sideline before the 1990 season would bring the rivalry to new national prominence.

1990–2001: Bowden vs. Spurrier
Steve Spurrier, who had won a Heisman Trophy as Florida's quarterback in 1966, returned as the head coach of the Gators for the 1990 season. During the eleven seasons that followed, the Florida–Florida State rivalry reached its peak of national importance. Because of the Sugar Bowl rematches following the 1994 and 1996 regular seasons, Florida and Florida State met fourteen times on the football field during the twelve seasons Spurrier coached the Gators. And each time, one or both teams were ranked in the top ten in the AP football poll.

The decade began auspiciously with the first meeting of top-10 squads in the history of the rivalry (UF No. 6, FSU No. 8) heading into FSU's 45–30 win in Tallahassee. The stakes were even higher in 1991 in Gainesville, as both teams were ranked in the AP Poll top five (FSU No. 3, UF No. 5). The Gators had just clinched their first SEC Championship while the Seminoles were still feeling the sting of a defeat at the hands of the rival Miami Hurricanes. The game was a defensive struggle that culminated in a Gator defensive stand late in the fourth quarter to preserve a 14–9 win. No. 3 FSU dominated the 1992 contest in Tallahassee 45–24 against then-No. 6 UF.

1993 brought about a collection of talent perhaps unequaled in the history of the rivalry.  Two future Heisman trophy winners in Charlie Ward and Danny Wuerffel were starting at quarterback. The No. 1 Seminoles beat the No. 7 Gators 33–21, and went on to win the Bowl Alliance national championship. In the 1994 contest in Tallahassee, Florida held a 31–3 lead at the start of the 4th quarter, but a furious FSU comeback ended in a 31–31 tie in what became known as the "Choke at Doak".  The teams were given a rematch in the Sugar Bowl ("The Fifth Quarter in the French Quarter"), which the Seminoles won 23–17. The No. 3 Gators beat the No. 6 Seminoles 35–24 in Gainesville in 1995, capping off Florida's first undefeated regular season.

For national championship implications, 1996 was the fiercest of the series. Both teams were undefeated and ranked No. 1 (UF) and No. 2 (FSU) coming into their regular season finale in Tallahassee, where the Seminoles won a hard-fought contest 24–21. Florida would go on to win the SEC and earn a rematch against the No. 1 Seminoles in the Sugar Bowl, where the Gators would win 52–20 for their first national championship in their ninety-year history. No. 1 FSU was undefeated coming into the 1997 contest against the No. 10 Gators in Gainesville, but Florida won again 32–29 with a late touchdown run by Fred Taylor followed by a Dwayne Thomas interception of Thad Busby to seal the victory.  After these setbacks, Florida State won three straight victories over Top 4 Florida teams, winning the 1998 and 2000 games in Tallahassee and the 1999 contest in Gainesville on their way to a second national championship.

Florida State and Florida combined for fourteen conference championships and three national championships during the 1990s. In addition, the winner of the game would play for the national championship five times in the decade. Through those years, FSU held a 7–4–1 advantage in a rivalry that was arguably the most important in college football during that time.

The 2001 game was Steve Spurrier's twelfth and final Florida–Florida State game as the head coach of the Gators. The 2001 Gators entered the game with national title aspirations, and easily defeated the Seminoles 37–13. Florida finished the season 10–2 ranked third nationally in both major polls; Florida State finished 8–4 and ranked fifteenth. The 2001 game was also the end of a twelve-year era for Florida; Spurrier would resign as the Gators head coach following the season, finishing with a 5–8–1 record in the rivalry series. The twelve Bowden–Spurrier face-offs provided several of the most memorable games in the series history.

2002–2004: Zook replaces Spurrier
Ron Zook made his rivalry debut as Florida's head coach in 2002, and the game marked the first time since 1986 that neither team was ranked in the AP Poll Top 10. Despite being a home underdog, Bowden's Seminoles won easily 31–14, starting a two-game series winning streak, which they continued in 2003 with a controversial 38–34 win in Gainesville known as "The Swindle in The Swamp".

Entering the 2004 game, the unranked 7–4 Gators were heavy underdogs when they arrived to face the No. 8 Seminoles in Tallahassee, where they had not won since 1986.  Zook had already been fired as the Gators' head man, but was allowed to finish the season. But on the night in which the turf at Doak Campbell Stadium was re-christened "Bobby Bowden Field" in honor of the long-serving Florida State coach, victory belonged to Zook's Florida Gators, 20–13, and Zook was carried from the field by his players and received a standing ovation from the visiting Florida fans.

Zook's third and final Florida–Florida State game as the Gators' coach started a six-game series winning streak for the Gators. With Florida's hiring of head coach Urban Meyer after Zook's departure, the Gators again rose to national prominence, winning the program's second and third national championships in 2006 and 2008, while Florida State struggled to regain the level of success for which the program was known during the 1990s.

2005–2010: Urban Meyer and Bowden's retirement

The 2009 Florida–Florida State game marked Bobby Bowden's thirty-sixth against the Gators in thirty-four seasons as the Seminoles head coach; it was also his last, as he retired at the conclusion of the 2009 season. He finished his head coaching career with a 17–18–1 record against the Gators.  Remarkably, Bowden's thirty-four years in Tallahassee spanned the tenures of seven different Gators head coaches: Doug Dickey (1970–78), Charley Pell (1979–85), Galen Hall (1985–89), Gary Darnell (1989), Steve Spurrier (1990–2001), Ron Zook (2002–04) and Urban Meyer (2005–10).

Florida State ended Florida's winning streak in 2010 under first-year head coach Jimbo Fisher, who led the Seminoles to a 31–7 win in Tallahassee. The 2010 contest was the last for Urban Meyer as Florida's head coach and his only loss to Florida State in six meetings.

2011–present: Evolving programs
In 2011, Fisher's Seminoles won their first game in Gainesville since 2003 despite gaining less than 100 yards of total offense. Florida quarterback John Brantley threw three interceptions that led to two short rushing touchdowns by Florida State running back Devonta Freeman in the Seminoles' 21–7 victory.

The 2012 contest marked the first time since 2004 that both teams were ranked in the top ten, and the rivalry game was the sixth-most watched televised game of the college football season as Florida used a ball control gameplan and forced four FSU turnovers to win 37–26 in Tallahassee. In 2013, Florida State was 11–0 and ranked #1 while the Gators were 4–7 on their way to their first losing record since 1979. The Seminoles beat the Gators 37–7 for their most lopsided win in Gainesville. FSU was again undefeated and ranked #1 in 2014 when they welcomed an unranked Florida team to Tallahassee. Florida's coach Will Muschamp had already been fired but was coaching out the remainder of the regular season. In what was his last game at Florida, his Gators kept it close before falling 24–19. In 2015, both teams were once again ranked when #13 Florida State traveled to Gainesville to face #12 Florida. Florida State's defense shut down the Gator offense under first year coach Jim McElwain, allowing only a late safety in a 27–2 rout. It was their third straight win in Gainesville. Florida's offense sputtered again in the 2016 game, and the Seminoles won 31–13 for their fourth straight win overall in the series.

Both programs suffered through sub-par seasons in 2017 and each came into their meeting at 4–6, marking the first time since 1959 that the rivals met while sporting a losing record. The season-ending game was the last for each head coach at their respective school, as Florida's Randy Shannon was serving on an interim basis after Jim McElwain's dismissal and Jimbo Fisher would accept the head coaching job at Texas A&M days later. The Seminoles won 38–22 for their fifth consecutive victory in the series and their fourth straight win in Gainesville, their longest win streak at Florida Field.

Both programs were led by new head coaches for the 2018 matchup: Willie Taggart at Florida State and Dan Mullen at Florida. In the first match-up between first year head coaches in series history, Mullen's Gators routed the Seminoles 41–14 in Tallahassee, ending both Florida State's five-game win streak in the series and their NCAA-record 36-year streak of bowl appearances. Taggart was fired nine games into the 2019 season, and Odell Haggins was serving as the Seminoles' interim coach during the Gators' 40–17 victory in Gainesville. The series was interrupted for the first time in over 60 years in 2020 when both the ACC and SEC played modified conference-only schedules due to the COVID-19 pandemic.

The 2021 contest was held in Gainesville as previously planned, and both teams came into the game with losing records (5-6) for just the third time in series history, with bowl eligibility on the line. With Dan Mullen having been fired days before the game, interim coach Greg Knox led the Gators to a "sloppy" 24–21 victory over Mike Norvell's Seminoles. The following year, Norvell beat new Florida coach Billy Napier's squad 45-38, making it the highest scoring game in series history.

Game results

Notable games

1961: A death in the family
Florida State's upstart football program stunned the Gators on this day with a 3–3 tie.  Florida coach Ray Graves likened the result to a "death in the family", Roy Bickford was the star for the Seminoles and was named the game MVP.  Bickford blocked a punt to set up the Seminoles' lone FG, intercepted a pass deep in FSU territory to avert a sure UF score, and had another interception on UF's last scoring drive.

1964: FSU's first win
Even though many of the early games in the series were close (and the 1961 contest ended in a 3–3 tie), Florida State had yet to beat their in-state rivals in six attempts. The 1964 game would be the first time that the Gators would journey to Doak Campbell Stadium, and the Seminoles under coach Bill Peterson were enjoying their best season since joining the ranks of major college football programs. However, the Gators still felt confident that another victory was in the offing, coming out onto the playing field with the boast "Never, FSU, Never!" attached to their helmets.

Florida State quarterback Steve Tensi hit Fred Biletnikoff with a first-half touchdown, helping the Seminoles to a 13–0 lead at the half as the Gator offense fumbled four times, including once at the FSU one-yard line. Florida, led by quarterback Steve Spurrier, finally scored in the 3rd quarter to cut the lead to 13–7, but were unable to find the endzone again. Les Murdock kicked a 42-yard field goal to secure the win for FSU, 16–7.

After the win, the Seminoles accepted their first bid to a major bowl game, defeating Oklahoma in the Gator Bowl to finish the season 9–1–1.

1966: Catch or not?
In an otherwise unremarkable game coming into this eighth annual contest between the burgeoning rivals, this game established the rivalry in full due to the controversy that surrounded its outcome.  In a tight contest, the Gators led the Seminoles late in the game, 22–19. FSU had the ball at the Gators' 45-yard-line with seventeen seconds left in the game.  On first down, little used and previously injured wide receiver Lane Fenner entered the game in place of FSU's star receiver Ron Sellers. FSU quarterback Gary Pajcic took the snap, Fenner got behind UF defenders, and Pajcic lofted a pass to Fenner in the front corner of the end zone for what appeared to be a game-winning FSU touchdown.  However, referee Doug Moseley signaled that Fenner did not have control of the ball before rolling out of bounds and ruled the pass incomplete.

Florida held on for a 22–19 win, but the controversy heated up after the game when photos that apparently showed Fenner making the catch in the endzone were published in state newspapers.  Debate over whether or not the play should have been ruled a touchdown continues to this day.  The 2014 Florida State Football Media Guide lists the final score as 26–22;  nevertheless, third-party references list the score as 22–19.

1969: Cappleman crunch
Both Florida and Florida State were 2–0 when the teams met in 1969.  The Gators had defeated the number seven ranked University of Houston two weeks prior and FSU was off to a good start as well. The Gators won this matchup 21–6 on the back of a defensive surge that was unparalleled in Gator history.  The Gators defense, led by junior defensive lineman Jack Youngblood and sophomore defensive lineman Robert Harrell, sacked FSU quarterback Bill Cappleman eleven times for 91 yards leaving FSU with a total of negative 18 yards rushing in the game.  In addition to the pass rush, the FSU offense fumbled the ball eight times, losing five. Two other Gator Sophomores starred in the game as well, All-American wide out Carlos Alvarez and quarterback John Reaves. The Gators went on to a 9–1–1 record including a victory over the Tennessee Volunteers in the Gator Bowl.

1970: Huff, the magic quarterback
The Florida Gators dominated Florida State for the first fifty-three minutes of the 1970 game.  FSU quarterbacks Frank Whigham and Tommy Warren failed to move the ball and with seven minutes left in the game the Gators led 38–7.  FSU coach Peterson put sophomore Gary Huff into the game and he quickly completed two long passes, the second a 43-yard touchdown pass.  The FSU defense forced John Reaves and the Gator offense into a three and out, and on the next drive Huff used four plays to score a touchdown with 2:30 left in the game. With the score cut to 38–21 FSU tried an onside kick which failed but didn't fail to cause a both bench-clearing brawl. The FSU defense again forced Florida to punt and as time expired, Huff led the Seminoles to another touchdown making the final score 38–27.  Gators All-American Jack Youngblood was criticized by the press for doing a "disrespectful rear-end wagging dance" on a wall near the FSU student section.  Both teams ended the season 7–4 but neither received a bowl bid. Huff's passing caused FSU to actually out gain the Gators in the game and it set, at the time, a record for most points scored by both teams in the rivalry.

1993: Ward to Dunn
The Seminoles came into The Swamp with a 10–1 record and aspirations of playing for a national championship. Florida State's lone defeat in 1993 was two weeks earlier at the hands of the Notre Dame Fighting Irish, 31–24, in South Bend. The Gators entered the contest 9–1, with a loss at Auburn, but had already clinched the SEC Eastern Division. The 'Noles took an early 13–0 lead in front of what was a state record 85,507 fans at Florida Field. FSU would never relinquish that lead. The Gators finally answered just before halftime when freshman Quarterback Danny Wuerffel hit his receiver Willie Jackson for an 11-yard touchdown pass to cut the Florida State lead to 13–7. Florida State got back to work on their first drive of the second half. Heisman Trophy winning quarterback Charlie Ward completed 5 of 7 passes for 62 yards, including a 7-yard touchdown strike to Kez McCorvey, giving the Seminoles a 20–7 lead. From this point, FSU appeared to have the upper hand as they took an impressive 27–7 lead entering the final quarter. Florida answered with another touchdown pass to Willie Jackson, this time from Terry Dean. FSU stormed right back and just when it appeared the 'Noles would seal the victory, fullback William Floyd coughed up the football and the Florida defense recovered at its own 9-yard line, giving the Gators and its crowd new life. After converting several fourth downs, Florida, behind Quarterback Terry Dean,  drove all the way to the FSU 31. Florida would cut the lead to 27–21 when Dean hit his receiver Jack Jackson for a remarkable, juggling, 31-yard touchdown pass which electrified the record crowd at The Swamp. With the crowd roaring louder than it had all day, Ward led the Seminoles back onto the field with just under 6 minutes left in the game. The Seminoles faced third down at their own 21-yard-line.  Unfazed, Charlie Ward hit freshman Warrick Dunn up the sideline for a 79-yard game-clinching touchdown run and a 33–21 FSU win. FSU would go on to win the 1993 National Championship, and Florida would win the SEC Championship the following week.

1994: The "Choke at Doak"

Both teams entered the game with identical 9–1 records. Florida, ranked fourth, and Florida State, the defending national champions, ranked seventh. Florida, under head coach Steve Spurrier, jumped out to an early lead. In the fourth quarter, Florida held a 31–3 lead over Bobby Bowden's Florida State squad.  In the greatest fourth-quarter comeback of the series, the Seminoles rallied and scored four unanswered touchdowns. With 1:45 left in the game, a 4-yard touchdown run by Rock Preston made the game 31–30. Coach Bowden had to make a decision—he chose to kick the extra point to tie rather than attempt a 2-point conversion to win the game, resulting in a final score of 31–31. Florida State scored 28 unanswered points in the final fifteen minutes to cap off the biggest fourth-quarter comeback of the series.  Both teams were selected to the Sugar Bowl for a rematch and the first bowl game between the two teams. The game became known as "The Fifth Quarter in the French Quarter."  With 1:32 left and Florida State holding a 23–17 lead, Florida's comeback attempt was thwarted when Danny Wuerffel's pass was intercepted by Florida State linebacker Derrick Brooks to seal the game.

1996: No. 1 vs. No. 2
The No. 1–ranked and undefeated Gators came into Tallahassee favored against the second-ranked Seminoles.  The 'Noles got off to a quick start when Peter Boulware blocked the Gators first punt of the game, resulting in a touchdown.  Florida's eventual Heisman Trophy winner quarterback Danny Wuerffel threw three interceptions in the first half, and FSU had a 17–0 lead after one quarter of play.

Wuerffel got on track after that, throwing for three touchdowns. The last one (to WR Reidel Anthony) cut the Florida State lead to three points with just over a minute left to play. The ensuing onside kick went out of bounds, however, and the Seminoles held on for the 24–21 upset win.

The stars of the game were FSU running back Warrick Dunn, who rushed for 185 yards; Wuerffel, who threw for 362 yards; and the FSU defense, which sacked Wuerffel six times and knocked him to the turf on many other occasions. That Seminole pass rush became a source of controversy after the game when Gators' coach Steve Spurrier claimed that FSU players had deliberately tried to injure his star quarterback with late hits and "cheap shots". The Seminoles had been flagged for roughing the passer twice during the game, and Spurrier had the UF video staff compile footage which he claimed showed FSU players tackling Wuerffel late a half-dozen additional times.

1997: Sugar Bowl rematch for the title

The late-hit controversy that began after the team's regular season meeting intensified when the Texas Longhorns upset third-ranked Nebraska Cornhuskers in the Big 12 Championship Game and Florida defeated Alabama in the SEC Championship Game, creating an FSU–UF rematch in the Sugar Bowl. Spurrier continued to complain to the press about the issue while FSU coach Bobby Bowden responded that he thought the hits in question were clean while admitting that "we just hit to the echo of the whistle instead of the whistle."

The Sugar Bowl match-up gained even more importance the night before the game when the second-ranked Arizona State Sun Devils lost to the fourth-ranked Ohio State Buckeyes in the Rose Bowl, making the contest between the No. 3 Gators and the No. 1 Seminoles the de facto national championship game.

To counter FSU's pass rush, Spurrier installed the shotgun formation in an attempt to give quarterback Danny Wuerffel more time to throw. The plan worked, as the Gators turned a close game (it was 24–20 early in the second half) into a 52–20 rout behind Wuerffel's 306 yards and three touchdown passes, earning the Gators their first national championship.

1997: Greatest game ever played in the Swamp
Florida State entered the game ranked No. 1 and a double-digit favorite over No. 10 Florida.  After a pregame fight, the Gators drove the ball 83 yards for a touchdown on the opening series.  Spurrier implemented a two-quarterback system with Doug Johnson and senior walk-on Noah Brindise, and rotated the two nearly every play.  Florida State led 17–6 early in the second quarter after Seminoles quarterback Thad Busby found tight end Melvin Pearsall for a five-yard touchdown.  The Gators fought back, however, as wide receiver Travis McGriff caught a touchdown from Johnson, and running back Fred Taylor scored from the 4-yard line to put Florida ahead 18–17 at halftime.  In the second half, kicker Sebastian Janikowski boomed his second of three field goals to put Florida State back on top, but Taylor responded with a 61-yard touchdown run to retake the lead, 25–20.  Seminoles running back Travis Minor scored on an 18-yard touchdown run, to give Florida State a 26–25 lead.  The first twelve minutes of the fourth quarter were scoreless, but the Seminoles drove inside the Gators' 5-yard line until the Gators defense, led by Jevon Kearse and Mike Peterson, stopped the 'Noles on three consecutive running plays and the Seminoles settled for another Janikowski field goal after which Janikowski performed a mock Gator Chomp in celebration.  On first down from the Gators' own 20-yard line, Johnson hit receiver Jacquez Green for a 62-yard pass play.  Fred Taylor completed the drive with his fourth rushing touchdown of the night, and Florida took the lead after the three-play drive for good, 32–29.  Florida State's final comeback attempt ended when senior Florida linebacker Dwayne Thomas intercepted a third-down pass from Busby, sealing the victory for the Gators, and costing Florida State a chance to play for the national championship.

1998: Not in our house!
This 1998 battle between the in state rivals started before the whistle even blew.  A pre-game fight caused Florida's starting senior safety, Tony George, and a couple walk-on FSU players who were not dressed, to be ejected from the game.  In the midst of the fight, it is rumored that Florida quarterback Doug Johnson attempted to hit FSU coach Bobby Bowden with a football. Johnson later apologized to Bowden for almost hitting him but said that he had thrown the ball into a group of FSU players during the scuffle with no particular target. Florida State's defense came in the ballgame rated No. 1 in the nation, Florida's defense was rated No. 1 in the SEC, so the game was set to be a defensive battle.  Florida struck first with a 50-yard Doug Johnson touchdown pass, but Seminoles Peter Warrick and Travis Minor put the Seminoles in scoring position twice and Placekicker Sebastian Janikowski kicked two field goals to make the game 7–6.  After a Florida punt the Seminoles were at their own 5-yard-line and Florida forced a safety. And then Doug Johnson drove Florida deep into Florida State territory after the safety kick, but Florida State's defense stiffened and forced Florida to settle for three points.  At halftime, the game was 12–6, Florida.

In the second half, Florida State's defense held Florida scoreless. Florida State's first touchdown of the game came when quarterback Marcus Outzen threw a pass that was deflected by a Gator defender right to Peter Warrick, who ran it in for the score.. Later in the game, Peter Warrick threw a touchdown to Ron Dugans on a trick play. The game ended 23–12, with Florida State the winner.

2003: Swindle in the Swamp
Florida State was ranked No. 9 and Florida No. 11 coming into the 2003 contest in Gainesville. It turned out to be a close and high-scoring affair, but it is most remembered for several controversial referee calls by the ACC officiating crew, and was christened the "Swindle in the Swamp" by several national and Florida sportswriters for the questionable calls on multiple fumble/no-fumble plays that went against Florida.  Florida nevertheless held a slim 34–31 lead late in the fourth quarter when Seminoles quarterback Chris Rix hit wide receiver PK Sam for a 52-yard touchdown pass with under a minute to go, giving Florida State a 38–34 lead. Before the winning score, Rix had completed a first down pass on a fourth-and-14 play deep in Seminoles territory to keep the drive alive. The Seminoles went on to hold off the Gators, 38–34.

After the game, a fight broke out on the field between the Florida and Florida State players after some Seminole players celebrated the win by jumping on the "F" logo in the center of Florida Field. FSU's athletic director apologized on behalf of the university for sparking the incident and both schools took steps to make sure similar incidents did not recur.

The questionable calls by the ACC officials, headed by Jack Childress, prompted Florida AD Jeremy Foley to demand the officiating crew be provided by the home team's conference. This change took effect with the 2005 game.

See also 

 List of NCAA college football rivalry games

References

Bibliography 

  2010 Florida State Football Media Guide, Florida State Athletics Department, Tallahassee, Florida, pp. 162, 170–173 (2010).
  2011 Florida Gators Football Media Guide, University Athletic Association, Gainesville, Florida, pp. 116–125 (2011).
 Carlson, Norm, University of Florida Football Vault: The History of the Florida Gators, Whitman Publishing, LLC, Atlanta, Georgia (2007).  .
 Golenbock, Peter, Go Gators!  An Oral History of Florida's Pursuit of Gridiron Glory, Legends Publishing, LLC, St. Petersburg, Florida (2002).  .
 Hairston, Jack, Tales from the Gator Swamp: A Collection of the Greatest Gator Stories Ever Told, Sports Publishing, LLC, Champaign, Illinois (2002).  .
 McCarthy, Kevin M.,  Fightin' Gators: A History of University of Florida Football, Arcadia Publishing, Mount Pleasant, South Carolina (2000).  .
 McEwen, Tom, The Gators: A Story of Florida Football, The Strode Publishers, Huntsville, Alabama (1974).  .
 Nash, Noel, ed., The Gainesville Sun Presents The Greatest Moments in Florida Gators Football, Sports Publishing, Inc., Champaign, Illinois (1998).  .
 Proctor, Samuel, & Wright Langley, Gator History: A Pictorial History of the University of Florida, South Star Publishing Company, Gainesville, Florida (1986).  .

College football rivalries in the United States
Florida Gators football
Florida State Seminoles football
1958 establishments in Florida
Sports rivalries in Florida